This article lists the main modern pentathlon events and their results for 2014.

Youth Olympic Games
 August 21 – 25: Modern pentathlon at the 2014 Summer Youth Olympics
 Boys' Individual:   Aleksandr Lifanov;   Gergely Regos;   Dovydas Vaivada
 Girls' Individual:   ZHONG Xiuting;   Francesca Summers;   Anna Matthes
 Mixed International Team Relay:   Maria Migueis Teixeira &  Anton Kuznetsov;   Anna Zs Tóth &  Ricardo Vera;   Aurora Tognetti &  PARK Gil-ung

Other multi-sport events (Modern Pentathlon)
 March 7 – 9: 2014 ODESUR Modern Pentathlon Championships in  Santiago
 Individual winners:  Felipe Nascimento (m) /  Yane Marques (f)
 Mixed Team Relay winners:  (Esteban Bustos & Javiera Rosas)
 October 2 & 3: Modern pentathlon at the 2014 Asian Games
 Individual winners:  Guo Jianli (m) /  Chen Qian (f)
 Men's Team winners:  (SU Haihang, Guo Jianli, & HAN Jiahao)
 Women's Team winners:  (Kim Sun-woo, JEONG Mi-na, & CHOI Min-ji)
 November 14 – 18: Modern pentathlon at the 2014 Central American and Caribbean Games
 Individual winners:  Ismael Hernández (m) /  Leydi Moya (f)
 Team Relay winners:  (Ismael Hernández & Saúl Rivera) (m) /  (Ximena Dieguez & Sophia Hernández) (f)
 Women's Team winners:  (Tamara Vega, Thelma Martinez, & Elena Nogueda)

World modern pentathlon championships
 May 14 – 19: 2014 World Youth "A" Modern Pentathlon Championships at  Budapest
 Youth Individual winners:  Anton Kuznetsov (m) /  Aurora Tognetti (f)
 Youth Team Relay winners:  (Alexandr Stepachev & Sergey Suslov) (m) /  (Irene Prampolini & Aurora Tognetti) (f)
 Youth Mixed Team Relay winners:  (Iryna Prasiantsova & Yaraslau Radziuk)
 Youth Men's Team winners:  (Luis Cruz, Emiliano Hernandez, & Ricardo Vera)
 Youth Women's Team winners:  (Francesca Summers, Eilidh Prise, & Kerenza Bryson)
 May 20 – 26: 2014 World Junior Modern Pentathlon Championships at  Drzonków
 Junior Individual winners:  Egor Puchkarevskiy (m) /  Zsófia Földházi (f)
 Junior Team Relay winners:  (Christian Zillekens & Marvin Faly Dogue) (m) /  (Francesca Tognetti & Gloria Tocchi) (f)
 Junior Mixed Team Relay winners:  (Gloria Tocchi & Alessandro Colasanti)
 September 1 – 7: 2014 World Modern Pentathlon Championships at  Warsaw
 Individual winners:  Aleksander Lesun (m) /  Samantha Murray (f)
 Team Relay winners:  (Valentin Prades & Valentin Belaud) (m) /  (Chen Qian & LIANG Wanxia) (f)
 Mixed Team Relay winners:  (Laura Asadauskaitė & Justinas Kinderis)
 Men's Team winners:  (Ádám Marosi, Róbert Kasza, & Bence Demeter)
 Women's Team winners:  (WANG Wei, Chen Qian, and LIANG Wanxia)

Contintental modern pentathlon championships
 June 17 – 23: 2014 European Junior Modern Pentathlon Championships at  Minsk
 Junior Individual winners:  Vladislav Mishchenko (m) /  Gloria Tocchi (f)
 Junior Team Relay winners:  (Dmitry Suslov & Viacheslav Bardyshev) (m) /  (Gloria Tocchi & Irene Prampolini) (f)
 Junior Mixed Team Relay winners:  (Anastasiya Spas & Vladislav Mishchenko)
 Junior Men's Team winners:  (Ilya Palazkov, Dzianis Zeliankevich, & Kirill Kasyanik)
 Junior Women's Team winners:  (Marie Oteiza, Julie Belhamri, & Adele Stern)
 July 7 – 12: 2014 European Modern Pentathlon Championships at  Székesfehérvár
 Individual winners:  Aleksander Lesun (m) /  Lena Schöneborn (f)
 Team Relay winners:  (Ilia Frolov & Oleg Naumov) (m) /  (Victoria Tereshchuk & Anastasiya Spas) (f)
 Mixed Team Relay winners:  (Justinas Kinderis & Laura Asadauskaitė)
 Men's Team winners:  (Peter Tibolya, Bence Demeter, & Róbert Kasza)
 Women's Team winners:  (Janine Kohlmann, Lena Schöneborn, and Annika Schleu)
 July 17 – 20: 2014 PanAm and NORCECA Senior Championships at  Mexico City
 Individual winners:  José Figueroa (m) /  Yane Marques (f)
 Team Relay winners:  (José Figueroa & Yaniel Velazquez) (m) /  (Samantha Achterberg & Isabella Isaksen) (f)
 Mixed Team Relay winners:  (Melanie McCann & Joshua Riker-Fox)
 Women's Team winners:  (Donna Vakalis, Melanie McCann, & Mathea Stevens)
 Junior Individual winners:  Charles Fernandez (m) /  Tamara Vega (f)
 Youth Individual winners:  Brendan Anderson (m) /  Isabel Brand (f)
 July 17 – 23: 2014 European Youth "A" Modern Pentathlon Championships at  Uppsala
 Youth Individual winners:  Alexander Lifanov (m) /  Irene Prampolini (f)
 Youth Team Relay winners:  (Daniel Steinbock & Hannes Stråle) (m) /  (Irene Prampolini & Silvia Salera) (f)
 Youth Mixed Team Relay winners:  (Sarolta Simon & Soma Tomaschof)
 Youth Men's Team winners:  (Serge Baranov, Alexander Lifanov, & Danila Glavatskikh)
 Youth Women's Team winners:  (Silvia Salera, Aurora Tognetti, & Irene Prampolini)
 July 30 – August 4: 2014 European Youth "B" Modern Pentathlon Championships in  Sant Boi de Llobregat
 Youth Individual winners:  Matteo Cicinelli (m) /  Aroa Freije (f)
 Youth Men's Team winners:  (Ivan Tarasov, Andrei Zuev, & Andrei Petrov)
 Youth Women's Team winners:  (Ekaterina Utina, Xeina Fralcova, & Irina Sukhinskaia)

2014 Modern Pentathlon World Cup
 February 26 – March 3: MPWC #1 in  Acapulco
 Event cancelled, due to extreme heat.
 April 2 – 6: MPWC #2 in  Cairo
 Individual winners:  Riccardo De Luca (m) /  Laura Asadauskaitė (f)
 Mixed Team Relay winners:  (Donata Rimšaitė and Dmitry Suslov)
 Men's Team winners:  (Valentin Belaud, Christopher Patte, & Valentin Prades)
 Women's Team winners:  (Laura Asadauskaitė, Lina Batuleviciute, & Karolina Guzauskaite)
 Junior Individual winners:  Egor Puchkarevskiy (m) /  WANG Wei (f)
 April 16 – 21: MPWC #3 in  Chengdu
 Individual winners:  Ilia Frolov (m) /  Chen Qian (f)
 Mixed Team Relay winners:  (Yang Soo-Jin & Hwang Woo-Jin)
 Junior Individual winners:  Jun Woong-tae (m) /  WANG Wei (f)
 April 30 – May 5: MPWC #4 in  Kecskemét
 Individual winners:  Ádám Marosi (m) /  Oktawia Nowacka (f)
 Mixed Team Relay winners:  (BIAN Yufei & CAI Zhaohong)
 Junior Individual winners:  Martin Bilko (m) /  Karolina Guzauskaite (f)
 June 5 – 9: MPWC #5 in  Sarasota
 Individual winners:  Aleksander Lesun (m) /  Oktawia Nowacka (f)
 Mixed Team Relay winners:  (Aleksander Lesun & Ekaterina Khuraskina)
 Junior Individual winners:  Jun Woong-tae (m) /  Karolina Guzauskaite (f)

References

External links
 Union Internationale de Pentathlon Moderne Website (UIPM)

 
Modern pentathlon
2014 in sports